Quanshan District is one of six districts of Xuzhou, Jiangsu province, China.

Administrative divisions
In the present, Quanshan District has 14 subdistricts.
14 subdistricts

References

www.xzqh.org 

County-level divisions of Jiangsu
Administrative divisions of Xuzhou